Kristina Olegovna Komissarova (born 24 February 2001) is a Russian footballer who plays as a midfielder and has appeared for the Russia women's national team.

Career
Komissarova has been capped for the Russia national team, appearing for the team during the 2019 FIFA Women's World Cup qualifying cycle.

References

External links
 
 
 

2001 births
Living people
Russian women's footballers
Russia women's international footballers
Women's association football midfielders
FC Chertanovo Moscow (women) players